Sir Jonathan Lionel Cohen KC (born 8 May 1951) is a retired British barrister and High Court judge (Family Division).

Life 
Cohen is the son of High Court judge Leonard Harold Lionel Cohen OBE (1922-2007) and grandson of High Court judge Lionel Cohen, Baron Cohen.

Educated at Eton and the University of Kent, Cohen was called to the bar, Lincoln's Inn, in 1974 and took silk in 1997.  He was appointed a Justice of the High Court and knighted in 2017.  Cohen retired in May 2021.

Arms

Notes 

1951 births
Living people
British Jews
People educated at Eton College
Alumni of the University of Kent
Members of Lincoln's Inn
Knights Bachelor
British barristers
21st-century English judges